Aguadilla Ice Skating Arena, A.I.S.A., is a multi-use facility in Aguadilla, Puerto Rico. The arena was the only ice skating facility in the Caribbean region. The facility is owned and administered by the city. The Ice Skating rink has been closed since it was heavily damaged during Hurricane Maria.

Brief history
A.I.S.A. opened its doors in 2005 as the only facility of its kind in the Caribbean. Although Puerto Rico hosts several ice skating events during the Christmas season, the AISA was the only ice skating facility open year-round.
The arena was designed & fabricated by Ice Rink Supply.com, using their internationally patented technology, for the Authority of Municipal Enterprises of the city. Aguadilla City Enterprises also administers Las Cascadas Water Park & Aguadilla Bowling Alley.

Features
The AISA also hosts numerous stores and establishments:

First Floor
 Ice Skating Rink
 1 Dinner Room (soon)
 2 Meeting Rooms

Second Floor
 Music Room (City Band)

External links
Will ice melt on Puerto Rico? 

Buildings and structures in Aguadilla, Puerto Rico
Indoor arenas in Puerto Rico
2005 establishments in Puerto Rico
Sports venues completed in 2005